Uvariastrum zenkeri is a species of plant in the Annonaceae family. It is found in Cameroon and Nigeria. It is threatened by habitat loss.

References

Annonaceae
Vulnerable plants
Flora of Cameroon
Flora of Nigeria
Taxonomy articles created by Polbot